Jeff Cotton (born April 17, 1997) is an American football wide receiver for the Green Bay Packers of the National Football League (NFL). He played college football at Idaho after playing for two years at Pima Community College.

Professional career

Los Angeles Chargers
Cotton signed with the Los Angeles Chargers as an undrafted free agent on April 25, 2020. He was waived by the Chargers during final roster cuts on September 5, 2020, but was signed to the team's practice squad the next day.

Jacksonville Jaguars
Cotton was signed by the Jacksonville Jaguars on July 31, 2021. He was cut by the Jaguars at the end of training camp on August 31, 2021, and was re-signed back to the team's practice squad. Cotton was elevated to the active roster on January 2, 2022, for the team's Week 17 game against the New England Patriots and made his NFL debut in the game. He signed a reserve/future contract on January 10, 2022.

On August 30, 2022, Cotton was waived by the Jaguars.

Arizona Cardinals
On September 14, 2022, Cotton signed with the practice squad of the Arizona Cardinals. He was released off the practice squad six days later.

Green Bay Packers
On November 9, 2022, Cotton was signed to the Green Bay Packers practice squad. He signed a reserve/future contract on January 10, 2023.

References

External links
Idaho Vandals bio
Green Bay Packers bio

1997 births
Living people
Players of American football from Arizona
American football wide receivers
Arizona Cardinals players
Idaho Vandals football players
Pima Aztecs football players
Jacksonville Jaguars players
Los Angeles Chargers players
Green Bay Packers players